Francis Seymour (1697 – 23 December 1761), of Sherborne House, Dorset, was a British landowner and Tory politician, who sat in the House of Commons from 1732 to 1741.

Seymour was the second son of Sir Edward Seymour, 5th Baronet and his wife Letitia Popham. In 1728, he succeeded to the estates of his paternal great-uncle Henry Seymour Portman  MP, which included Sherborne House. He married on 30 July 1728 his cousin Elizabeth Popham, Dowager Lady Hinchingbrooke (died 20 March 1761), daughter of Alexander Popham, of Littlecote, Wiltshire, MP, and great granddaughter of Colonel Alexander Popham.

Seymour was returned as Tory Member of Parliament for Great Bedwyn at a by-election on 29 April 1732. At the 1734 British general election he was elected in a contest as MP for Marlborough on the Bruce interest. He did not stand again in 1741. On all recorded occasions, he voted against the Administration of Walpole.
 
Seymour died on 23 December 1761, leaving two children: 
Mary Seymour, who married John Baily in 1758 
Henry Seymour, of Redland Court, Gloucestershire (1729–1807)

References

1697 births
1761 deaths
People from Sherborne
British MPs 1727–1734
British MPs 1734–1741
Members of the Parliament of Great Britain for English constituencies
Francis Seymour, of Sherborne, Dorset
Members of Parliament for Great Bedwyn
Members of Parliament for Marlborough
Younger sons of baronets